Peter Aspinall (born 4 April 1994) is a former English rugby league footballer who last played for York City Knights. He previously played for Huddersfield Giants and Sheffield Eagles.

References

1994 births
Living people
English rugby league players
Huddersfield Giants players
Rugby league locks
Sheffield Eagles players
York City Knights players